Andrea Zanoni (born 26 August 1965 in Treviso) is a politician from Veneto, Italy.

A long-time green activist and campaigner, he was an unsuccessful candidate of the Federation of the Greens in the 2005 regional election. Having joined Italy of Values, in 2009 he was elected to the European Parliament, where he switched to the Democratic Party in 2013.

In the 2015 regional election Zanoni, who had failed re-election to the EP in 2014, was elected to the Regional Council of Veneto as a Democrat.

Zanoni was re-elected for a second term as regional councillor in the 2020 regional election.

References

1965 births
Living people
People from Treviso
Italy of Values MEPs
Democratic Party (Italy) MEPs
MEPs for Italy 2009–2014
21st-century Italian politicians
Members of the Regional Council of Veneto